A by-election was held for the New South Wales Legislative Assembly electorate of Wollondilly on 16 September 1915 following the death of Frank Badgery.

Dates

Result

Frank Badgery died.

See also
Electoral results for the district of Wollondilly
List of New South Wales state by-elections

References

1915 elections in Australia
New South Wales state by-elections
1910s in New South Wales